José Luis "Nuno" López Muñoz (born November 11, 1951) is a Puerto Rican politician affiliated with the New Progressive Party (PNP). He was a member of the Puerto Rico House of Representatives for two separate instances (2001-2005, 2009–2017), representing District 1.

Early years and studies

José Luis López Muñoz was born in Humacao, Puerto Rico on November 11, 1951. He is the second of three children. He completed his elementary and high school studies in San Lorenzo, Puerto Rico, graduating from the José Campeche High School. He was also president of his Graduate Class.

López completed a Bachelor's degree in Political Sciences from the Interamerican University of Puerto Rico.

Political career

In 1970, López became the president of the PNP Youth in San Lorenzo. Four years later, he was appointed to be Director of the PNP Youth statewide, which in turn, made him a member of the Party Board.

Since 1977, he has worked as Special Aide to then-Speaker of the House Angel Viera Martínez, Legislative Aide to the House of Representatives of Puerto Rico, and Executive Aide to the Speaker of the House.

López was first elected as Representative at the 2000 general election, where he defeated Carmen Yulín Cruz, from the PPD. However, López lost his chance for reelection when he was defeated at the 2003 primaries.

In 2008, López ran again, winning a slot first at the PNP primaries and then prevailing at the 2008 general election.

López was reelected at the 2012 general election.

López was defeated by Eddie Charbonier in the 2016 PNP Primaries.

Personal life

López is married and has six children.

References

External links
José López Muñoz Official biography

Living people
1951 births
Interamerican University of Puerto Rico alumni
New Progressive Party members of the House of Representatives of Puerto Rico
People from Humacao, Puerto Rico